Kevin Keller may refer to:
Kevin Keller (composer), American recording artist and composer
Kevin Lane Keller (born 1956), author and marketing professor
Kevin Keller (character), the first openly gay character in the Archie Comics